The Jiangxi University of Technology High School (Pinyin: Jiāngxī Kējì Xuéyuàn Fùshǔ Zhōngxué ), colloquially Jiangkefuzhong abbreviated to JKFZ, is a private nonprofit high school affiliated to Jiangxi University of Technology, founded in 2015, JKFZ is one of the most prestigious high schools in Jiangxi.  JKFZ is situated in the Qingshanhu District of Nanchang, Jiangxi.

Campus and facilities

The campus covers 67 thousand square meters, and provides an environment for students' learning, lodging as well as cultural and athletic activities. 
Campus facilities include a modern weatherproof stadium, high-standard laboratories, computer center, library, science and technology museum, Chinese studies museum, geography park, sky bridge linking buildings, pottery room, cooking-skills room, intelligent access control system, all-weather monitoring system, drinking water system, as well as safe and comfortable canteen, teacher's and student's lodging houses.

JKFZ equips every class with two classrooms, of which the main classroom will serve as a lecture hall as well as a quiet study space while the auxiliary classroom will be used as an activity, exploration, and life room. This is the first innovation among middle schools in Jiangxi Province.

The campus includes indoor basketball arena, badminton hall, table tennis training hall and gymnasium available under any weather conditions, as well as the 400m and 8-track synthetic-rubber track-and-field stadium, providing open spaces for students.

Teachers
In 2015 JKFZ recruited 61 teachers as the founding teachers team, including 6 special-class teachers and 22 senior-level teachers, the average age is 36.

Further recruitment took place and there are 136 teachers, including 9 special-class teachers, 52 senior-level teachers. 

In October 2016 there are now 222 teachers including 9 Foreign Teachers.

Students
In 2015 JKFZ admitted following number of students:

See also

Jiangxi University of Technology
JKFZ Cambridge International School

References

External links
 JKFZ official website

Schools in Jiangxi
Education in Jiangxi